Ceromitia schajovskoii is a moth of the Adelidae family or fairy longhorn moths. It was described by Pastrana in 1961. It is found in Argentina.

References

Moths described in 1961
Adelidae
Endemic fauna of Argentina
Moths of South America